Tuija Vuoksiala (born 25 August 1961) is a Finnish biathlete. She competed in three events at the 1994 Winter Olympics.

References

1961 births
Living people
Biathletes at the 1994 Winter Olympics
Finnish female biathletes
Olympic biathletes of Finland
Place of birth missing (living people)